Enrique Baldivieso Aparicio (born 1902 in Tupiza, d. 1957) served as the 24th vice president of Bolivia from 1938 to 1939, during the presidency of Germán Busch. He was elected to the post for a four-year term by the National Convention of 1938, which was then serving as Bolivia's unicameral legislature.

References

1902 births
1957 deaths
Vice presidents of Bolivia
Presidents of the Chamber of Deputies (Bolivia)
Foreign ministers of Bolivia
Bolivian diplomats